Rabab al-Sadr Charafeddine (Arabic: رباب صدر; born 4 April 1944) is a Lebanese activist and president of the Imam al-Sadr Foundation. She is the sister of disappeared Shia imam and political leader Musa al-Sadr.

Early life 
Rabab al-Sadr was born in Qom, Iran on 4 April 1944. Her father, Sayyid Sadr al-Din al-Sadr, died when she was nine years old. In 1959, at the age of 15, she and her brother moved to Tyre, Lebanon, their ancestral home.

Education and family life 
In her youth, al-Sadr studied fashion design and painting at an Italian university. She completed a doctorate in philosophy in 2017, with the topic "The practical philosophy of the imam Musa al-Sadr".

She is the sister of political leader, Shia imam and Amal Movement leader Musa al-Sadr.

Al-Sadr was married to Hussein Charafeddine at age of 16. They have four children, including Raed Charafeddine and Najad Charafeddine. She has eleven grandchildren.

Career 
Al-Sadr is the president of the Tyre-based Imam al-Sadr Foundation, a non-governmental organization in southern Lebanon.

The foundation traces it roots to the Dar al-Fatta ("Girls' House") founded by Rabab and Musa al-Sadr in 1962, three years after their arrival in Tyre. This organization taught women skills such as knitting, embroidery, housekeeping, and first aid. After Musa's disappearance on 31 August 1978, Rabab took over management. Since then, the foundation has grown to its current state, providing education, social, and health services.

During the Lebanese Civil War, al-Sadr traveled Lebanon trying to convince women to not let their male family members partake in the war, as well as offering guidance and services to those affected by the war. Also during the war, she negotiated for the release of victims of kidnapping on both sides.

On 13 August 2017, al-Sadr was awarded the Grand Cross of the Order of Malta for her cooperation with the organization.

References

External links 

 Imam al-Sadr Foundation

Lebanese anti-war activists
Lebanese women activists
Living people
1944 births